William Rapihana Harrison (9 June 1938 – 30 December 2021) was a New Zealand rugby league footballer who played in the 1960s.

Playing career
Harrison played for the Korodale club in the Wellington Rugby League competition, winning premierships in 1960 and 1961 and sharing another in 1963.

Representative career
Harrison was a Wellington and New Zealand Māori representative before he was selected for the New Zealand national rugby league team. He toured on the 1961 tour of Great Britain and France and represented New Zealand in 1961 against Great Britain and France. Due to injury he played in only 10 games on tour, a broken jaw restricted his appearances. Despite this, he replaced the legendary Jack Fagan in the third test against Great Britain and the first test against France. Harrison proved himself to be one of the finds of the tour.

Injury prevented him playing for the Kiwis in 1963 but he was selected for the North Island side against the South Island.

Personal life and death
Harrison was the brother of fellow former international Rata Harrison, and brother-in-law of former Kiwis manager, Manu Diamond. Billy Harrison died on 30 December 2021, at the age of 83, and was buried at Akatarawa Cemetery, Upper Hutt.

References

1938 births
2021 deaths
New Zealand Māori rugby league players
New Zealand Māori rugby league team players
New Zealand national rugby league team players
New Zealand rugby league players
North Island rugby league team players
Place of birth missing
Rugby league fullbacks
Wellington rugby league team players
Burials at Akatarawa Cemetery